Anette Igland (born 2 October 1971) is a Norwegian former footballer who played for the Norway women's national football team that won silver medals at the 1991 FIFA Women's World Cup in China. At club level she represented the Sogn og Fjordane clubs Kaupanger IL and Bremanger IL. She played 66 times for Bremanger IL and stepped in as chairman of the club in 2011.

Anette's younger sister Ingebjørg Igland was also a footballer and played for Norway's youth national teams.

References

External links
 
 
 

1971 births
Living people
Norwegian women's footballers
Norway women's international footballers
1991 FIFA Women's World Cup players
Women's association football defenders